Odostomia subscripta is a species of sea snail, a marine gastropod mollusc in the family Pyramidellidae, the pyrams and their allies.

Distribution
This species occurs in the Atlantic  Ocean off West Africa.

References

External links
 To World Register of Marine Species

subscripta
Gastropods described in 1994